Hemipilia cruciata is a species of plant in the family Orchidaceae. It is found in China and Taiwan.

References

cruciata
Endangered plants
Orchids of China
Orchids of Taiwan
Taxonomy articles created by Polbot